Cotana lunulata is a moth in the family Eupterotidae. It was described by George Thomas Bethune-Baker in 1904. It is found in New Guinea.

The wingspan is about 45–54 mm. Females are very similar to those of Cotana meeki, but are paler and more rufescent on the wings, while the postdiscal white bands are much narrower.

References

Moths described in 1904
Eupterotinae